The Lhasa–Xigazê railway, or La'ri railway, is a high-elevation railway that connects Lhasa to Xigazê, in the Tibet Autonomous Region. The travel time between Lhasa and Xigazê on this line is roughly three hours.

History

The line was a spur line of the Qinghai–Tibet railway. Construction began in September 2010 and was connected to the Qinghai–Tibet Railway in May 2013. The line was completed in July 2014 and opened for commercial operations on August 16, 2014. Soon after opening, the line became the primary mode of transport between Lhasa and Xigazê; the two destinations were previously only connected by road and air, and air travel was too expensive at the time for the large majority of local residents.

The exiled Central Tibetan Administration in Dharamsala has claimed that the rail line will dilute the cultural identity of Tibetans by accelerating the movement of Han migrants into Tibet.

Stations
The line includes 14 stations, of which only a few see regular passenger traffic (Qüxü, Rinbung). The project had a budget of 10.8 billion yuan.

The completion of this project opened up possible extensions of the network further west and south into Nepal and to Yadong County, close to the border with Sikkim, India.

Lhasa railway station
Lhasa South railway station
Baide railway station
Xierong railway station
Qüxü County railway station
Chabala railway station
Nyêmo railway station
Karu railway station
Rinbung railway station
Dazhuka railway station
Denggu railway station
Jiqiong railway station
Kadui railway station
Xigazê railway station

Extension

Although there were plans to extend the line with another  to the Chinese border with Nepal, those plans became delayed due to difficulties on the Nepal side after the April 2015 Nepal earthquake.  Feasibility studies were proposed for extension towards Zhangmu, although another border crossing may be chosen due to major Nepali abandonment of the border post. However it has also been reported that the line will be extended to Gyirong County regardless of the progress on the China-Nepal railway.

See also
 Qinghai–Tibet railway

References

Railway lines in China
Mountain railways
Rail transport in Tibet
Railway lines opened in 2014
2014 establishments in China